Stephen Mount (born 5 March 1960) is a former Australian rules footballer who played for Richmond in the Victorian Football League (VFL).

Mount played four seasons with Richmond, his nine games in 1980 including the club's 81 point Grand Final win over Collingwood. He left Richmond after managing just one game in 1982, heading west to join South Fremantle in the West Australian Football League. Mount played 42 matches for South Fremantle between 1983 and 1985 before switching to Perth for the next three seasons, playing another 48 matches for the Demons.

He is now at St. Kevin's College in Melbourne teaching Science, Health and P.E.

References

External links

1960 births
Living people
Richmond Football Club players
Richmond Football Club Premiership players
South Fremantle Football Club players
Perth Football Club players
Tasmanian State of Origin players
Sandy Bay Football Club players
Australian rules footballers from Tasmania
One-time VFL/AFL Premiership players